Sondre Flem Bjørshol (born 30 April 1994) is a Norwegian footballer who plays as a right-back for Viking FK.

Career
Bjørshol was born in Stavanger and played for local club Vidar, where he won the Dana Cup in 2010. On 26 July 2016, he signed for Norwegian First Division club Åsane. On 16 August 2018, Bjørshol returned to Stavanger, signing a two and a half-year contract with Viking.

Career statistics

Honours
Vidar
 Dana Cup: 2010

Viking
 Norwegian First Division: 2018
 Norwegian Football Cup: 2019

References

External links
 Profile for Viking FK

1994 births
Living people
Sportspeople from Stavanger
Norwegian footballers
FK Vidar players
Åsane Fotball players
Viking FK players
Norwegian Second Division players
Norwegian First Division players
Eliteserien players
Association football defenders